Taylor Harry Fritz (born October 28, 1997) is an American professional tennis player. He has a career-high singles ranking of world No. 5 by the Association of Tennis Professionals (ATP), achieved on February 27, 2023, and a doubles ranking of world No. 104, achieved on July 26, 2021. Fritz has won five ATP Tour singles titles, including a Masters 1000 title at the 2022 Indian Wells Masters. His best result in a Grand Slam tournament was reaching the quarterfinals of the 2022 Wimbledon Championships. He is currently the No. 1 American player.

Fritz reached his maiden ATP final in only his third career event, the 2016 Memphis Open. Only one other American, John Isner, has reached an ATP final in fewer career events. He won a junior major singles title at the 2015 US Open, and was the runner-up in junior singles at the 2015 French Open.

Early life and background
Fritz was born the youngest of three boys to Kathy May, a former top-10 player, and Guy Henry Fritz, who also played professional tennis and was named US Olympic Development Coach of the Year 2016.
Taylor Fritz is the great-great-grandson of David May, founder of The May Department Stores Company, which merged with Macy's.

Fritz has two older maternal half-brothers, Chris and Kyle.

Fritz grew up with his brothers in Rancho Santa Fe in the San Diego metropolitan area. He attended Torrey Pines High School, where he won the CIF singles title in the San Diego section as a freshman. A few months into his sophomore year, he switched to an online high school to play full-time ITF junior events.

Junior career
Fritz did not play any ITF events until he was 15, when he competed in a low-level Grade-4 tournament in March 2013 in Claremont near where he grew up. He would not play another event until the 2013 Junior US Open, at which point he began to compete regularly on the ITF Circuit shortly before turning 16. Within the next year, he made it to the semifinals at the 2014 Junior Wimbledon tournament. He then won his first Grade A tournament at the 2014 Osaka Mayor's Cup.

In 2015, Fritz reached at least the quarterfinal of all four junior Grand Slam tournaments, including the final at the French Open where he lost to Tommy Paul, and the final at the US Open where he defeated Paul. This major success helped him finish the year as the number-one-ranked boy's junior tennis player, for which he was named the 2015 ITF Junior World Champion. He was the first American to hold this title since Donald Young in 2005 and Andy Roddick in 2000.

Professional career

2015: ATP debut
Fritz played his first ATP Tour tournament at Nottingham, where he received a wild card and won his first ATP match against Pablo Carreño Busta.

In September 2015, Fritz turned pro after winning the Junior US Open. He quickly rose from the 600s into the top 250 of the ATP rankings by becoming the 9th player at age 17 to win multiple Challenger Tour titles – doing so in back-to-back weeks. The others to accomplish that feat include Top 20 players Bernard Tomic, Tomáš Berdych, Richard Gasquet, and Juan Martín del Potro as well as Number 1 overall players Rafael Nadal and Novak Djokovic.

2016: Top 100 and ATP Tour final

After he lost in the final of his last tournament of 2015, Fritz reached a final again in his first tournament of 2016, this time winning against top-100 player Dudi Sela at Happy Valley to catapult to a ranking in the 150s. In the following week, he made it through Australian Open Qualifying to reach his first main draw of a Grand Slam tournament at the Australian Open, where he would lose in the 1st round to fellow American Jack Sock in five sets.

Fritz was awarded a wildcard into his first ATP 250 tournament of 2016 at Memphis and knocked off the second-seeded Steve Johnson, who at No. 29 was the highest ranked player Fritz had ever defeated. With his victory over Ričardas Berankis in the semifinal, he became the youngest American to reach an ATP final since Michael Chang in 1988, and also the second-fastest American ever to reach an ATP final, doing so in just his third career ATP tournament. John Isner is the only American that was able to reach an ATP final faster. Fritz would lose in the final to three-time defending champion and top-10 player Kei Nishikori. In February, Fritz cracked the top 100 for the first time by reaching the quarterfinals in Acapulco at his first career ATP 500 event.

Fritz's grass-court season was highlighted by a close three-set loss to Roger Federer at Stuttgart. He would end up peaking in the rankings at No. 53 towards the end of the summer. At the US Open, Fritz drew Jack Sock in the first round of a major for the second time this year, again losing in five sets.

To cap off the year, Fritz won the ATP Star of Tomorrow for being the youngest player in the top 100, having just turned 19.

2017: First win in a major
Fritz was able to achieve his first victory over a top ten ATP player at Indian Wells defeating sixth seed Marin Čilić in the second round. Fritz struggled through the first half of the year with injury problems and ended up skipping the clay court season to focus on recovering. He returned to form in the summer with quarterfinals at Los Cabos and Winston-Salem. In his seventh grand slam appearance, Fritz won his first match at a major tournament by knocking out Marcos Baghdatis at the US Open.

2018: Top 50 debut
After finishing 2017 just outside the top 100, Fritz had a good start to the 2018 season, reaching two Challenger finals in January. He returned to the Top 100 of the ATP rankings by reaching the final in New Caledonia, though he lost there to Noah Rubin. Following a loss in qualifying at the Australian Open, he then won his first Challenger title in two years at the inaugural event in Newport Beach, not too far from his current residence in Palos Verdes.

He continued his strong start by making it to the fourth round at Indian Wells, his first round of 16-appearance at a Masters event.

Fritz kicked off the clay-court season with a semifinals appearance at the US Men's Clay Court Championships in Houston, the best result on clay of his career thus far. In the tournament, he upset Ryan Harrison and Jack Sock before losing to Steve Johnson. This helped him get back to No. 66 in the world.

At the US Open, Fritz reached his first Grand Slam third round, defeating Mischa Zverev and Jason Kubler, before losing to 9th-seeded Dominic Thiem in four sets.

Earlier in the season, Fritz began working with Paul Annacone, who helped him reach a career-high ranking of world No. 47 on November 5, 2018.

2019: Top 25, first ATP title

Fritz made the third round at the Australian Open, losing to Roger Federer in 3 sets.  Fritz then went on to win the Challenger at Newport Beach, California; he defeated Brayden Schnur of Canada in the final, in straight sets. In June, Fritz won his first ATP Tour title at the Eastbourne International by defeating Sam Querrey in straight sets. In the first round of Wimbledon, Fritz defeated Tomáš Berdych in straight sets, before losing to Jan-Lennard Struff in four sets.  At the US Open, Fritz was seeded 26th, his first-ever Grand Slam seeding. However, in the first round, he lost to Feliciano López.

Fritz represented Team World in the third annual Laver Cup, held in Geneva. In his first singles match, he lost to Stefanos Tsitsipas. Fritz bounced back on the final day of play in defeating Dominic Thiem. At the Swiss Indoors, Fritz defeated 2nd-seeded Alexander Zverev in the first round in straight sets.  After achieving a career-high ranking of world No. 25 on August 5, 2019, Fritz ended the year ranked No. 32 in the world.

2020: First ATP 500 final
Fritz began his season at the inaugural 2020 ATP Cup, representing Team USA. He went 1–2 in the singles competition, as Team USA was sent out of the tournament in the round-robin stage.

At the Australian Open, Fritz reached the third round, posting a five-set victory over Kevin Anderson. He was then defeated by eventual finalist Dominic Thiem.

Fritz reached his first ATP 500 final in Acapulco, where he lost to Rafael Nadal. However, his runner-up showing propelled him to a new career-high ranking of world No. 24 on March 2, 2020.

At the US Open, Fritz was seeded 19th. He defeated Dominik Koepfer in four sets and then beat Gilles Simon in the second round before losing to Denis Shapovalov in the third round in five sets.

At the French Open, Fritz was seeded 27th. He defeated Tomáš Macháč in five sets and Radu Albot in straight sets before losing to Lorenzo Sonego in the third round in straight sets. The match against Sonego had the longest tie-break in French Open history, with Fritz losing the tie-break 17–19.

2021: Indian Wells semifinal, American No. 1

Fritz started his 2021 season at the first edition of the Murray River Open. Seeded sixth, he made it to the third round, where he lost to Jérémy Chardy. Seeded 27th at the Australian Open, he reached the third round where he was defeated by top seed, eight-time champion, and eventual champion, Novak Djokovic, in five sets, despite coming back from two sets to love down.

In Doha, Fritz reached the semifinals beating Lorenzo Sonego, sixth seed David Goffin, and fourth seed Denis Shapovalov. He ended up losing in the semifinals to Nikoloz Basilashvili. Seeded 15th at the Dubai Championships, he got revenge on Basilashvili, defeating him in the second round in three sets. He was beaten in the third round by second seed Andrey Rublev. Seeded 22nd at the Miami Open, he reached the fourth round where he lost to 32nd seed Alexander Bublik. Despite this loss, this was his best showing at this Masters 1000 event and only his second fourth round in a Masters 1000 tournament in his career.

Fritz dropped again out of the top 30 on May 10, 2021, following first-round losses at Monte-Carlo and Madrid. This drop in the rankings also marked the first time no American men players were in the Top 30 in the near half-century of computerized tennis rankings. At the 2021 French Open, Fritz was seeded 30th. He defeated João Sousa in the first round in straight sets. In the second round, Fritz suffered a torn meniscus during his 4-set loss to Dominik Koepfer. Following this, Fritz said he hoped to be back in time for the 2021 Wimbledon Championships following surgery. Fritz would end up returning in time to play Wimbledon and proceeded to make the third round, where he lost to Alexander Zverev.

At the 2021 BNP Paribas Open he earned his first top 10 win in 2 years by beating world No. 7 and 5th seed Matteo Berrettini to reach the second fourth round at a Masters 1000 of the year and only the third in his career. It was his first win against a Top-10 opponent in 2021 and the seventh of his career. Fritz then beat 10th seed Jannik Sinner to advance to his first Masters 1000 quarterfinal. There, he saved 2 match points to earn his biggest win of the year, beating world No. 4 and 3rd seed Alexander Zverev to reach his first Masters 1000 semifinal, where he lost to Nikoloz Basilashvili.

At the 2021 St. Petersburg Open, Fritz turned 24, and won against countryman Tommy Paul. He would end up making the final, where he lost to Marin Čilić.

Fritz made his second Masters 1000 quarterfinal at the 2021 Rolex Paris Masters, where he beat Lorenzo Sonego, 5th seed and world No. 6 Andrey Rublev for his third Top-10 win of the year, and 10th seed and Indian Wells champion Cameron Norrie. He lost to Novak Djokovic in the quarterfinals. With this successful run he reached a new career-high ranking in the top 25 at world No. 23 and became the No. 1 American player in singles on November 8, 2021.

Fritz ended the year ranked 23.

2022: Indian Wells & Tokyo titles, World No. 8, ATP Finals debut & semifinal

Fritz started his 2022 season by representing the USA at the ATP Cup. The USA was in Group C alongside Canada, Great Britain, and Germany. He defeated Félix Auger-Aliassime of Canada and Cameron Norrie of Great Britain, but lost to Alexander Zverev of Germany. The USA ended fourth in Group C. Seeded 20th at the Australian Open, Fritz reached the second week of a Grand Slam for the first time after defeating 15th seed, Roberto Bautista Agut, in the third round in five sets. He fell in the fourth round to fourth seed Stefanos Tsitsipas in five sets. As a result, he made his debut in the top 20 of the singles rankings on January 31.

As the top seed at the first edition of the Dallas Open, Fritz made it to the quarterfinals where he was eliminated by seventh seed and compatriot, Marcos Giron. Seeded seventh in Acapulco, he lost in the second round to qualifier Yoshihito Nishioka. Representing the USA in the Davis Cup tie against Colombia, Fritz played one match and beat Alejandro González. In the end, the USA beat Colombia 4–0 to make up for Colombia defeating them last year. Seeded 20th at the Indian Wells Masters, Fritz became the first American to reach the final at the event since John Isner in 2012 by beating 29th seed, Alex de Minaur, in the fourth round, Miomir Kecmanović in the quarterfinals, and seventh seed, Andrey Rublev, in the semifinals. He then defeated fourth seed, three-time champion, and the then-21 grand slam champion Rafael Nadal in the final in straight sets, claiming his maiden Masters 1000 title, his second career ATP title overall, and snapping Nadal's 20-match win streak. It was also his first win over a member of the Big Three in nine career matches. It marked the first time an American man had won the Indian Wells title since Andre Agassi in 2001. Fritz made his top 15 debut with his victory, reaching a career-high ranking of no. 13 in the world. Seeded 11th at the Miami Open, Fritz entered the tournament wanting to complete the Sunshine Double. However, he failed to do after losing to in the fourth round to Miomir Kecmanović in three sets.

Fritz started his clay-court season at the U.S. Clay Court Championships in Houston, Texas. Seeded second, he reached the quarterfinals where he lost to fifth seed and 2019 champion, Cristian Garín. Seeded 10th at the Monte-Carlo Masters, he lost in the quarterfinals to eventual finalist Alejandro Davidovich Fokina. Fritz missed the Madrid Open and Italian Open due to a left foot injury. Seeded 13th at the French Open, he was beaten in the second round by qualifier Bernabé Zapata Miralles.

Fritz began his grass-court season at the Libéma Open. Seeded third, he suffered a second-round upset at the hands of Dutch wildcard and eventual champion, Tim van Rijthoven. Seeded fourth at the Queen's Club Championships, he was ousted from the tournament in the first round by British wildcard Jack Draper. Seeded third at the Eastbourne International, he beat sixth seed and defending champion, Alex de Minaur, in the semifinals to reach the final here at this event for the first time since 2019 when he won the title. He defeated compatriot Maxime Cressy in the final to win his third ATP Tour title, and second in Eastbourne. Seeded 11th at Wimbledon, he defeated Alex Molčan and qualifier Jason Kubler in the third and fourth rounds respectively to reach his first major quarterfinal. In the quarterfinals, he pushed world No. 4, 2nd seed, and two-time champion Rafael Nadal to five sets, but ended up losing the match in a fifth-set tiebreak.

Fritz's American swing began in Washington, where he was the third seed. After beating Alexei Popyrin in straight sets, he retired against Dan Evans in the third round due to the heat, despite having a match point in the second set. At the Canada Masters, he beat Andy Murray and Frances Tiafoe before losing again to Evans in 3 sets. In Cincinnati, Fritz reached the quarterfinals after beating Sebastián Báez, Nick Kyrgios and 6th seed and world No. 8 Andrey Rublev. He lost to world No. 1 Daniil Medvedev in the quarterfinals.  At the US Open he suffered a shocking first round defeat against first time qualifier compatriot Brandon Holt. This was also Holt's first career win on the ATP Tour.

Fritz withdrew from the Korea Open due to COVID-19, however he reached his second ATP 500 tour-level final in Tokyo where, as the third seed, he beat James Duckworth, Hiroki Moriya, received a walkover from 5th seed Nick Kyrgios and beat 7th seed Denis Shapovalov in the semifinals. As a result, he entered the top 10 for the first time in his career. He defeated Frances Tiafoe in straight sets in the final where he became the first American champion since Pete Sampras in 1996. He reached a new career-high ranking of World No. 8 on 10 October 2022, becoming the first American to crack the Top 10 since Jack Sock in 2017.
At the Paris Masters, he won against Alejandro Davidovich Fokina in the first round before losing in the second round to French wildcard player Gilles Simon in a three tight-set match that lasted 3 hours and 5 minutes. As a result he did not qualify for the 2022 ATP Finals but became in line as first alternate. On 5 November, with Carlos Alcaraz's withdrawal after an abdominal injury, Fritz qualified for the 2022 ATP Finals, the first American to participate since John Isner in 2018. In the round robin stage, he defeated top seed and world No. 2 Rafael Nadal on his debut. It was his first win over a top-3 player. He then lost to third seeded Casper Ruud but won against Félix Auger-Aliassime to book his spot in the semifinals, the first American since Jack Sock in 2017 to reach this level. It was his 45th tour level win for the season. He lost to Novak Djokovic in straight sets.

Fritz finished the year ranked inside the top-10 for the first time in his career, at world No. 9.

2023: United Cup champion, Fifth title, World No. 5
Fritz started the season at the inaugural 2023 United Cup, as the No. 1 American male player, where the United States team became champion defeating Italy in the final. Next at the Australian Open, he lost in the second round to wildcard Alexei Popyrin. Fritz saved a match point against him in the fourth set to make it two sets each, but lost a hard-fought match lasting more than four hours.

At the 2023 Dallas Open he reached the semifinals where he lost to eventual champion Wu Yibing. As a result he reached a new career high ranking of world No. 7 becoming the highest ranked American since Mardy Fish in 2011. The following week seeded as the top seed, he reached back-to-back semifinals at the 2023 Delray Beach Open. Next he defeated Mackenzie McDonald to reach his first ATP final of the season and tenth overall. In the final, he defeated Miomir Kecmanović for his fifth ATP Tour title. As a result he moved to world No. 5 in the rankings on 27 February 2023.
At the Mexican Open he defeated sixth seed Frances Tiafoe to reach his third straight semifinal. 
Next he lost to seventh seed and compatriot  Tommy Paul in an epic match lasting three and a half hours, setting the record for the longest match in the 30-year history of the Abierto Mexicano Telcel.

Playing style
Fritz is an offensive baseliner. Fritz’s groundstrokes are powerful and penetrating, and can force errors out of his opponents, or outright end points as winners. His most powerful and consistent stroke is his forehand, though he possesses a strong backhand groundstroke as well, that is flatter and lower bouncing.

Fritz possesses a dominant serve that can reach 149 mph, and solid groundstrokes off both wings. One of Fritz's defining strengths is his ability to hit sharp angle cross-court shots on both the backhand and forehand sides. He also has a good topspin lob.

Personal life
Fritz has a son (born in 2017) with ex-wife Raquel Pedraza, who also played professional tennis.

Since June 2020, Fritz has been in a relationship with model and influencer Morgan Riddle.

World TeamTennis
Fritz has played three seasons with World TeamTennis, making his debut in 2015 with the San Diego Aviators. He has since played another two seasons for the Aviators, in 2018 and 2019. Fritz joined the Philadelphia Freedoms during the 2020 WTT season at The Greenbrier. The Freedoms advanced to the WTT Playoffs as the No. 1 seed, but ultimately fell to the New York Empire in the semifinal. Fritz was named the WTT 2020 Male MVP.

Career statistics

Grand Slam tournament singles performance timeline

Current through the 2023 Australian Open.

Significant finals

Masters 1000 finals

Singles: 1 (1 title)

Notes

References

External links

 
 
 
 

1997 births
Living people
American people of German descent
American people of German-Jewish descent
American male tennis players
US Open (tennis) junior champions
Grand Slam (tennis) champions in boys' singles